Mark Ashton or Mark Ashton Vey (born Mark McVey; 23 June 1949) is a British painter, musician, compositer, ex-drummer of the English progressive rock band Rare Bird.

Early life
Mark Ashton was born 23 June 1949, in Bridge, Kent, England.
Soon he moved to Scotland and grew up in the Scottish countryside of Stirlingshire, near Glasgow. At a very young age, he shows a talent for drawing and music, and the passion for music soon predominated.

Music career
When he came back to England (Herne Bay, Kent) he joined his first band The Vikings as a drummer at 11 years old. The 2nd band Corvettes was voted the best band in Kent, U.K and played in a band which opened for acts such as The Rolling Stones, Pink Floyd and The Yardbirds, at this time he began writing music.
Formed his first band in 1965 Turnstile at 16 years old, began composing and released their first single Riding A Wave (Side B "Trot") on Pye Records.
devoted to the original songs, as early as the single "Riding Wave" will be released by pie record.

Rare Bird
In 1968 Mark Ashton moved to London. he joined a band called Rare Bird and their first single "Sympathy" became an international hit record, sold more than 2 million albums, and over 350 cover versions.

Headstone
After "Rare Bird", he quit the drums and concentrate to writing music. In 1974 Mark formed "HEADSTONE" and made two albums with Trident Production - EMI Records, 1st album Bad Habit (1974), the 2nd album Headstone (1975).
Producer John Anthony has already produced the 1st Album of Yes (1968) and Queen(1973).

Solo career

In 1976 he recorded his first solo album Mark Ashton L.A. in Los Angeles and the producer was Chris Bond (produced of Hall & Oats).

Then the second solo album Solo Mark Ashton was recorded in England, the producer Alain Callan is the personal manager of Led Zeppelin.

New York, Los Angeles
In 1980 he moved to New York or Los Angeles and pursued a solo career. Impressed by the scenery of the US, so different from his native Scotland, Mark Vey rediscovered gradually his love of painting, parallel to his musical activities. 
In 1988, released the album Modern Pilgrims by R.C.A. Records.

US, Europe

1991 Recorded and produced his "New Volum of Music" L.A. 
1993-1996: Sign with Sony Music Publishing Paris as comositeur. 
1996-2002: Director of exclusive A/F APG Music (an independent record label) in New York. 
1996 Begin as a painter and exhibits in New York, London, Barcelona, St. Tropez, Aix-en-Provence, Hambourg.

South of France

After 3 years painting in Spain, Mark Ashton moved to Nice, French Riviera. His love for this famous Mediterranean light has inspired his creations.  
And in parallel to his painting career he formed in 2012 his new "Mark Ashton project" with French musicians. 
Mark Ashton Vey exhibited in New York, London, Nice, Berlin etc. His paintings are on permanent display in various galleries around the world.
Since 2015, he changed the style of his music more acoustic using Hurdy Gurdy.

Discography

1968: Turnstyle: Riding a wave (Pye Records)

1969: Rare_Bird: Rare Bird, Charisma Records, London

1970: Rare Bird: As Your Mind Flies By, Charisma Records, London

1974: Headstone: Bad habits (John_Anthony) EMI, London

1975: Headstone: Headstone (John Anthony) EMI, London

1976: Mark Ashton L.A. (Chris Bond) 20th Century Records, L.A.

1979: Solo (Alan Callan) Ariola Records, London

1988: Modern pilgrims (Paul Rothchild), RCA Records, L.A.

References

Living people
People from Bridge, Kent
1949 births
People from Herne Bay, Kent
Musicians from Kent